Gymnastics at the 2018 Summer Youth Olympics was held from 7 to 16 October at the America Pavilion in Buenos Aires, Argentina.

Qualification

Summary

Acrobatic

Each National Olympic Committee (NOC) can enter a maximum of 1 team of 2 athletes. As hosts, Argentina was given a team to compete, causing a reduction to the number of teams qualified from the Americas. The remaining 11 teams were to be decided at the 2018 Acrobatics World Championships. Host Argentina declined the quota while no nation from Oceania competed. The United States declined the quota, and thus the two places were reallocated to Asia and Europe.

To be eligible to participate at the Youth Olympics athletes must have been born between 1 January 2000 and 31 December 2003.

Artistic
Each National Olympic Committee (NOC) could enter a maximum of two athletes, one per each gender. As hosts, Argentina wase given the maximum quota should they not have qualified normally and two spots, one for each gender, were decided by the tripartite commission; however, only one was given. These quotas caused a reduction from the continental quota depending on which continent the chosen nation was from. The remaining quotas were determined through five continental qualifiers.

To be eligible to participate at the Youth Olympics male athletes must have been born between 1 January 2001 and 31 December 2002 while female athletes must have been born between 1 January 2003 and 31 December 2003. Also athletes who have participated in FIG senior competitions or multisport games may not participate in the Youth Olympic Games

Rhythmic
Each National Olympic Committee (NOC) can enter a maximum of 1 athlete. As hosts, Argentina was given a spot to compete should they not qualify and one quota was to be given by the tripartite commission, however none was awarded. These quotas would have caused a reduction from the continental quota depending which continent the chosen nation is from. The remaining quotas were decided at five continental qualifiers.

To be eligible to participate at the Youth Olympics athletes must have been born between 1 January 2003 and 31 December 2003. Also athletes who have participated in FIG senior competitions or multisport games may not participate in the Youth Olympic Games

Trampoline
Each National Olympic Committee (NOC) can enter a maximum of 2 athletes, 1 per each gender. As hosts, Argentina was given a spot to compete in either the Men’ or Women’ events and one quota will be given to either the Men’ or Women’ events by the Tripartite Commission. Argentina chose to compete in the Men's event while no tripartite quota was awarded. This caused a reduction from the continental quota depending which continent the chosen nation is from. The remaining quotas were decided through five continental qualifiers.

To be eligible to participate at the Youth Olympics athletes must have been born between 1 January 2001 and 31 December 2002. Also athletes who have participated in FIG senior competitions or multisport games may not participate in the Youth Olympic Games

Medal summary

Medalists

Acrobatic gymnastics

Artistic gymnastics

Boys' events

Girls' events

Mixed team

Rhythmic gymnastics

Trampoline gymnastics

Medal table

References

External links

Official Results Book – Gymnastics

 
2018 Summer Youth Olympics events
Youth Summer Olympics
2018 Summer Youth Olympics